Ladda xicca is a species of butterfly in the family Hesperiidae. It is found in Peru and Bolivia.

Subspecies
Ladda xicca xicca - Peru
Ladda xicca paza Evans, 1955 - Bolivia

References

Butterflies described in 1913